Killam/Killam-Sedgewick Airport  is located  east of Killam, Alberta, Canada.

References

External links
Place to Fly on COPA's Places to Fly airport directory

Registered aerodromes in Alberta
Flagstaff County